Memecylon is a plant group in Melastomataceae. It consists of 350-400 species of small to medium-sized trees and shrubs occurring in the Old World tropics. Memecylon is a monophyletic group basal to the Melastomataceae clade. Memecylon taxa have more than 600 published basionyms. Diversity of this group is concentrated in tropical Africa, Madagascar, Sri Lanka, India and Malaysia.

Etymology 

The name Memecylon is derived from 'memaecylon' as used by ancient Greek philosophers Dioscorides and Pliny to describe the red fruits of Arbutus unedo (oriental strawberry tree), an unrelated plant group, alluding to the pink to reddish berries often produced by Memecylon. Some vernacular names in different regions of the world are given below.
English: "Blue mist plant", Hindi: Anjan; Malayalam: Aattukanala [ആറ്റുകനല], Kaasaavu: [കാശാവ്], Kaayaampoo: [കായാമ്പൂ]; Odia: Neymaru; Sinhala: Korakaha, Welikaha; Tamil: Kaya.

Morphology 
Memecylon sensu lato can be diagnosed by exstipulate leaves, four-merous bisexual flowers, anthers opening by slits, enlarged connectives bearing terpenoid secreting glands and berries. Memecylon sensu stricto can be distinguished from other Memecyloids by obscure nervation on leaves, non-glandular roughened leaf surface having branched sclerids, imbricate calyx, unilocular ovary and large embryo with thick and convoluted cotyledons.

Stems
Species of larger stature have a characteristic brown bark with narrow and sharp furrows, most are small single stemmed trees. However, the bark of many species of smaller stature is varied and may be papery white or smooth dark red-black.

Leaves
Leaves are opposite, short-stalked, elliptic or ovate, mostly with widely spaced pinnate nerves either visible or obscure. Leaves along the twig are all the same size, shiny, glabrous, with entire margins, the node has a characteristic scar between the leaves, the twig bark is typically red, striated and flaky.

Flowers
The inflorescence is typically dense and axillary. The florets are small (usually less than 5 mm) compared to the other taxa in Melastomataceae, with short fleshy corolla parts. Cymes are bracteate, usually thyrsoid to umbel shaped, often condensed to sessile fascicles of flowers or a few-flowered heads at tips of peduncles. The florets are white or violet, the stamens blue or violet, usually obvious in aggregates, from axillary clusters. Flowers are bisexual, have inferior ovaries, but the parts are otherwise free. The calyx is valvate and there are twice as many stamens as petals.

Fruits
The fruit is from an inferior ovary, typically axillary. The calyx remnants are persistent, and are sometimes blue-black. Fruits are globose or occasionally ellipsoid, pulpy or juicy with one large seed.

Distribution 

This group is distributed in approximately 53 countries of the Old World tropics and occupies a wide range of habitats. Memecylon taxa have been reported from montane forests, tropical lowland forests, grasslands, tropical rainforests with low to high rainfall, rocky mountain regions and regions with low to high temperature and a considerable overlap between ranges of different taxa. Most of the plants in this group are regionally or locally endemic. Endemic Memecylon are reported from 21 countries. The global distribution of this group is shown in the following Figure and some of the countries which have endemic Memecylon species are listed in the table.

Table1. Number of Memecylon taxa reported from different countries

Phylogeny

Phylogeny based on morphological treatments
The classification of Memecylon has switched back and forth among families Melastomataceae, Myrtaceae and Memecylaceae based on morphological, anatomical and molecular evidence. Early classifications excluded Memecylon and Mouriri from the Melastomataceae mainly based on placentation and seed characters. Subsequent treatments preferred to treat Memecylon as a member of Myrtaceae. Again, this group has been included in Melastomataceae by Cronquist . After that, morphological and anatomical character analysis of the Melastomataceae and their traditional allies by Renner identified two major lineages (Melastomataceae and Memecylaceae), and in that classification, Memecylon was placed in the Memecylaceae. Synapomorphies used in this phylogenetic analysis were anther connective and dehiscence, dorsal glands on stamen connectives, endothecium, placentation, locules, seeds, leaf venation, terminal leaf sclereids, paracytic stomata, stomata shape, leaf sclereids, indumentum, ant and mite domatia, wood and growth form characters, which excluded Memecylaceae from Melastomataceae. However, in Memecylon some characters such as seasonal flowering and small size of flowers contributed to the difficulty of assessing relationships based on the morphology. Later, several groups have been either included in broadly defined Memecylaceae or segregated from it. As a result, Memecylaceae comprised the groups Memecylon, Lijndenia, Mouriri, and Votomita.

Phylogeny based on molecular treatments
Molecular phylogenetic analyses using rbcL sequence data showed that the Melastomataceae lineage consists of a subclade formed by Oliniaceae, Penaeaeae, Phynchocalycaceae and Alzateaceae sister to a subclade formed by Memecylaceae and Melastomataceae sensu stricto. Parsimony analysis showed distinct Myrtaceae and Melastomataceae clades. Subsequently, Bayesian analyses using chloroplast DNA sequences from the rbcL and ndhF genes, and parsimony and maximum likelihood analyses on rRNA, rbcL and atpB sequences, have shown that Memecylaceae is a sister group to Melastomataceae. Later studies using combined exon and intron sequences of the nuclear glyceraldehyde 3-phosphate dehydrogenase gene (GapC) has supported the monophyly of Memecylon. However, the APG IV (Angiosperm Phylogeny Group IV) system of classification, a system of revised and updated classification of flowering plants, now recognizes the groups of Memecylaceae within a broader circumscription of Melastomataceae.

The most recent phylogenetic analysis of Memecylon was based on low-copy nuclear loci using representative taxa across the old world tropics, and this study revealed biogeography and ancestral states of this plant group. In addition, there is a fine-scale study associated with South African Memecylon showing the reticulate evolution of this group.

Pollination and seed dispersal 

The dense and axillary showy clusters of Memecylon florets do not produce nectar. These flowers are visited by pollen-gathering bees who vibrate or manipulate the anthers. Anthers open by longitudinal slits and exposed pollen invites pollen gathering bees. Anther appendages serve as a hold for bees’ legs. These flowers have terpenoid secreting glands and bees collect terpenoids. Therefore, buzz pollination is also favored. Berries are dispersed by birds and mammals. Populations of Memecylon are widely scattered within the forests as would be expected in bird-dispersed species.

Ecology 

Memecylon produce flowers and fruits more regularly than many trees of the equatorial forests. It provides a food supply for wildlife as a source of fruits. Different sympatric groups appear to segregate mainly by soil moisture.

Ethnobotany 

Memecylon has economic, medicinal and horticultural values. A yellow dye and a mordant can be extracted from the leaves. They are traditionally used for dyeing silk in Thailand and the robes of Buddhist monks in Sri Lanka. Fruits are edible and some are used as spices. This group provides hard and valuable timber used for building houses and boats. Wood is used to make rafters, house posts, fuel wood, charcoal, tools, and handles. An infusion of leaves is used as astringent for ophthalmia. The bark is applied as a poultice to bruises. Root and heartwood decoctions are used to bring down fever associated with colds, chicken pox and measles.

A list of Memecylon species

Memecylon aberrans 
Memecylon accedens 
Memecylon acrocarpum 
Memecylon acrogenum 
Memecylon acuminatissimum 
Memecylon acuminatum 
Memecylon aenigmaticum 
Memecylon aequidianum 
Memecylon affine 
Memecylon afzelii 
Memecylon agastyamalaianum 
Memecylon alatum 
Memecylon albescens 
Memecylon alipes 
Memecylon ambrense 
Memecylon amherstianum 
Memecylon amoenum 
Memecylon amplexicaule 
Memecylon amplifolium 
Memecylon amshoffiae 
Memecylon andamanicum 
Memecylon angustifolium 
Memecylon antseranense 
Memecylon apoense 
Memecylon arcuatomarginatum 
Memecylon argenteum 
Memecylon arnhemense 
Memecylon auratifolium 
Memecylon australissimum 
Memecylon azurinii 
Memecylon bachmannii 
Memecylon bakerianum 
Memecylon bakossiense 
Memecylon balakrishnanii 
Memecylon basilanense 
Memecylon batekeanum 
Memecylon bernierii 
Memecylon bezavonense 
Memecylon biokoense 
Memecylon boinense 
Memecylon bokorensis 
Memecylon borneense 
Memecylon brachybotrys 
Memecylon bracteatum 
Memecylon bracteolatum 
Memecylon brahense 
Memecylon bremeri 
Memecylon bretelerianum 
Memecylon buxifolium 
Memecylon buxoides 
Memecylon caeruleum 
Memecylon calderense 
Memecylon calophyllum 
Memecylon calyptratum 
Memecylon campanulatum 
Memecylon candidum 
Memecylon candolleanum 
Memecylon cantleyi 
Memecylon capitellatum 
Memecylon capuronii 
Memecylon cardiophyllum 
Memecylon caudatum 
Memecylon celebicum 
Memecylon centrale 
Memecylon ceramense 
Memecylon cerasiforme 
Memecylon chevalieri 
Memecylon cinereum 
Memecylon clarkeanum 
Memecylon clavistaminum 
Memecylon cogniauxii 
Memecylon collinum 
Memecylon confertiflorum 
Memecylon confusum 
Memecylon conocarpum 
Memecylon constrictum 
Memecylon cordatum 
Memecylon cordifolium 
Memecylon corticosum 
Memecylon corymbiforme 
Memecylon cotinifolioides 
Memecylon coursianum 
Memecylon courtallense 
Memecylon crassifolium 
Memecylon crassinerve 
Memecylon crassipetiolum 
Memecylon cumingii 
Memecylon cuneatum 
Memecylon dalleizettei 
Memecylon dallmannense 
Memecylon dasyanthum 
Memecylon delphinense 
Memecylon deminutum 
Memecylon densiflorum 
Memecylon dichotomum 
Memecylon diluviorum 
Memecylon discolor 
Memecylon dolichophyllum 
Memecylon dubium 
Memecylon durum 
Memecylon edule 
Memecylon eduliforme 
Memecylon eglandulosum 
Memecylon elaeagni 
Memecylon elegans 
Memecylon ellipticum 
Memecylon elliptifolium 
Memecylon elongatum 
Memecylon emancipatum 
Memecylon englerianum 
Memecylon erythranthum 
Memecylon excelsum 
Memecylon faucherei 
Memecylon fernandesiorum 
Memecylon fianarantse 
Memecylon flavescens 
Memecylon flavovirens 
Memecylon floridum 
Memecylon fragrans 
Memecylon fruticosum 
Memecylon fugax 
Memecylon fuscescens 
Memecylon galeatum 
Memecylon garcinioides 
Memecylon geddesianum 
Memecylon geoffrayi 
Memecylon germainii 
Memecylon gibbosum 
Memecylon giganteum 
Memecylon gitingense 
Memecylon gopalanii 
Memecylon gracile 
Memecylon gracilipedicellatum 
Memecylon gracilipes 
Memecylon gracillimum 
Memecylon grande 
Memecylon grandifolium 
Memecylon greenwayi 
Memecylon griffithianum 
Memecylon hainanense 
Memecylon harmandii 
Memecylon helferi 
Memecylon heyneanum 
Memecylon hookeri 
Memecylon huillense 
Memecylon hullettii 
Memecylon humbertii 
Memecylon hylandii 
Memecylon hyleastrum 
Memecylon idukkianum 
Memecylon impressivenum 
Memecylon inalatum 
Memecylon incisilobum 
Memecylon infuscatum 
Memecylon insigne 
Memecylon insperatum 
Memecylon insulare 
Memecylon interjectum 
Memecylon intermedium 
Memecylon isaloense 
Memecylon ivohibense 
Memecylon jadhavii 
Memecylon jambosioides 
Memecylon klaineanum 
Memecylon kollimalayanum 
Memecylon korupense 
Memecylon kosiense 
Memecylon kunstleri 
Memecylon kupeanum 
Memecylon kurichiarense 
Memecylon lanceolatum 
Memecylon lancifolium 
Memecylon langbianense 
Memecylon laruei 
Memecylon lateriflorum 
Memecylon laurentii 
Memecylon laureolum 
Memecylon lawsonii 
Memecylon leucanthum 
Memecylon liberiae 
Memecylon ligustrifolium 
Memecylon lilacinum 
Memecylon littorale 
Memecylon loheri 
Memecylon longicuspe 
Memecylon longifolium 
Memecylon longipetalum 
Memecylon louvelianum 
Memecylon luchuenense 
Memecylon lurerii 
Memecylon lushingtonii 
Memecylon macneillianum 
Memecylon macrocarpum 
Memecylon macrodendron 
Memecylon macrophyllum 
Memecylon madgolense 
Memecylon magnifoliatum 
Memecylon malaccense 
Memecylon mamfeanum 
Memecylon mananjebense 
Memecylon mandrarense 
Memecylon mangiferoides 
Memecylon manickamii 
Memecylon mayottense 
Memecylon megacarpum 
Memecylon megaspermum 
Memecylon memoratum 
Memecylon merguicum 
Memecylon minimifolium 
Memecylon minutiflorum 
Memecylon mocquerysii 
Memecylon monchyanum 
Memecylon mouririoides 
Memecylon multinode 
Memecylon mundanthuraianum 
Memecylon myrianthum 
Memecylon myricoides 
Memecylon myrtiforme 
Memecylon myrtilloides 
Memecylon natalense 
Memecylon nigrescens 
Memecylon nodosum 
Memecylon normandii 
Memecylon novoguineense 
Memecylon nubigenum 
Memecylon obscurinerve 
Memecylon obtusifolium 
Memecylon occultum 
Memecylon ochroleucum 
Memecylon octocostatum 
Memecylon odoratum 
Memecylon oleifolium 
Memecylon oligophlebium 
Memecylon orbiculare 
Memecylon oubanguianum 
Memecylon ovatifolium 
Memecylon ovatum 
Memecylon ovoideum 
Memecylon pachyphyllum 
Memecylon pallidum 
Memecylon paniculatum 
Memecylon papuanum 
Memecylon paradoxum 
Memecylon parvifolium 
Memecylon pauciflorum 
Memecylon pedunculatum 
Memecylon pendulum 
Memecylon peracuminatum 
Memecylon perangustum 
Memecylon perditum 
Memecylon pergamentaceum 
Memecylon perplexum 
Memecylon perrieri 
Memecylon phanerophlebium 
Memecylon phyllanthifolium 
Memecylon pileatum 
Memecylon planifolium 
Memecylon plebejum 
Memecylon polyanthemos 
Memecylon polyanthum 
Memecylon ponmudianum 
Memecylon procerum 
Memecylon protrusum 
Memecylon pseudomegacarpum 
Memecylon pseudomyrtiforme 
Memecylon pterocarpum 
Memecylon pterocladum 
Memecylon pteropus 
Memecylon pubescens 
Memecylon pulvinatum 
Memecylon purpurascens 
Memecylon pusilliflorum 
Memecylon ramosii 
Memecylon ramosum 
Memecylon randerianum 
Memecylon revolutum 
Memecylon rheophyticum 
Memecylon rhinophyllum 
Memecylon rivulare 
Memecylon roseum 
Memecylon rostratum 
Memecylon rotundatum 
Memecylon rovumense 
Memecylon royenii 
Memecylon rubiflorum 
Memecylon ruptile 
Memecylon sabulosum 
Memecylon sahyadricum 
Memecylon salicifolium 
Memecylon sambiranense 
Memecylon schraderbergense 
Memecylon schumannianum 
Memecylon scolopacinum 
Memecylon scutellatum 
Memecylon sejunctum 
Memecylon semsei 
Memecylon sepicanum 
Memecylon sessile 
Memecylon sessilifolium 
Memecylon simulans 
Memecylon sisparense 
Memecylon sitanum 
Memecylon sivadasanii 
Memecylon sivagirianum 
Memecylon sorsogonense 
Memecylon soutpansbergense 
Memecylon stenophyllum 
Memecylon strumosum 
Memecylon subcaudatum 
Memecylon subcordifolium 
Memecylon subcuneatum 
Memecylon subfurfuraceum 
Memecylon subramanii 
Memecylon subsessile 
Memecylon sumatrense 
Memecylon sylvaticum 
Memecylon symplociforme 
Memecylon talbotianum 
Memecylon tayabense 
Memecylon teitense 
Memecylon tenuipes 
Memecylon terminale 
Memecylon terminaliiflorum 
Memecylon tetrapterum 
Memecylon thouarsianum 
Memecylon thouvenotii 
Memecylon tirunelvelicum 
Memecylon toamasinense 
Memecylon torrei 
Memecylon torricellense 
Memecylon travancorense 
Memecylon tricolor 
Memecylon trunciflorum 
Memecylon tsaratananense 
Memecylon uapacoides 
Memecylon ulopterum 
Memecylon umbellatum 
Memecylon urceolatum 
Memecylon utericarpum 
Memecylon vaccinioides 
Memecylon varians 
Memecylon venosum 
Memecylon verruculosum 
Memecylon virescens 
Memecylon viride 
Memecylon vitiense 
Memecylon wallichii 
Memecylon wayanadense 
Memecylon wightii 
Memecylon xiphophyllum 
Memecylon zambeziense 
Memecylon zenkeri 

A number of taxa have been recently re-assigned to other species. These include:
Memecylon arnottianum , synonym of Lijndenia capitellata 
Memecylon bequaertii , synonym of Warneckea bequaertii 
Memecylon elegantulum , synonym of Memecylon rostratum 
Memecylon gardneri , synonym of Lijndenia gardneri 
Memecylon sessilicarpum , synonym of Warneckea sessilicarpa 
Memecylon sphaerocarpum , synonym of Memecylon ovatifolium

Sources
 Plants of World Online ((POWO): Memecylon L.: Accepted Species.

References

 
Melastomataceae genera
Taxonomy articles created by Polbot
Taxa named by Carl Linnaeus